Oak Grove High School is a combined middle school and high school. Its location is fifteen miles northwest of downtown Bessemer, a suburb of Birmingham, Alabama. It is physically located in the unincorporated community of Oak Grove for which the school is named. Oak Grove is one of fourteen high schools in the Jefferson County School System. School colors are red, white, and black but the athletic teams are called the Tigers. Oak Grove competes in AHSAA Class 4A athletics.

Student profile 
Enrollment in grades 6-12 for the 2015-2016 school year was approximately 865 students. Roughly 95% are white, 4% are African-American, and 1% are Native American. 32% of students qualified for free or reduced price lunch.

Oak Grove has a graduation rate of 82%. Approximately 84% of its students meet or exceed state proficiency standards in reading, and about 66% do so in mathematics. The average ACT score for Oak Grove students is 25.

Championships 
 Oak Grove Winter Guard: 2018 SCGC SRA Regional Champions, 2018 SCGC SRA Alabama State Champions
 Oak Grove Indoor Drumline: 2012 SCGC PSA Alabama State Champions, 2014 SCGC PIA Alabama State Champions, 2016 SCGC PSA Alabama State Champions, 2018 SCGC PSA Alabama State Champions.
 Oak Grove Indoor Winds: 2016 SCGC WSA Alabama State Champions, 2018 SCGC WSA Alabama State Champions
 Oak Grove Marching Band Alabama State Champions 2018 class 4a
 Oak Grove Marching Band Alabama State Champions 2019 class 4a
 Oak Grove Marching Band Alabama State Champions 2021 class 4a

Athletics 
Oak Grove competes in AHSAA Class 4A athletics and fields teams in the following sports: (updated to 2017-2018 school year)
 Baseball
 Boys Basketball
 Girls Basketball           
 Bowling
 Cheerleading
 Boys Cross Country
 Girls Cross Country
 Football
 Boys Golf
 Girls Golf
 Boys Outdoor Track & Field
 Girls Outdoor Track & Field
 Softball
 Boys and Girls Tennis
 Volleyball
 Wrestling

Oak Grove football 
Oak Grove has 5 region championships and 1 state championship. Its first team was started back in 1922. Oak Grove has an overall record of 333-472-27 (.410). Their first playoff appearance was in 1973. Since then, they have made the playoffs 13 times, with the latest one coming back in 2010. Their playoff record is 8-13.  The Oak Grove team made nine appearances in the "Dental Clinic Classic," a football game played annually between 1948-1995 for the "Jefferson County Championship."  Their record was 3-6 in those games winning for the first time in 1973 defeating Pleasant Grove High School by a score of 41-0.  They also won the game in 1981 and 1983 defeating Corner and Warrior respectively.

Oak Grove's main rivals are Corner High School, Brookwood High School (Alabama) and Hueytown High School.

Record vs. rivals:
 Corner: 31-34-1 (.447%)
 Brookwood: 16-25-1 (.390%)
 Hueytown: 1-18-2 (.053%)

1998 tornado & campus reconstruction
An F5 tornado struck several communities of Jefferson County just before eight o'clock in the evening on April 8, 1998 with some of the most serious destruction in the Oak Grove community. The tornado resulted in more than 25 fatalities and destroyed numerous homes and businesses and destroyed the original Oak Grove High School on Lock 17 Road. The school, which at that point served grades K-12, was damaged beyond repair with the elementary school portion destroyed.

During the two years it took to construct the new school, students were relocated more than sixteen miles away to the campus of Gilmore-Bell Vocational School in Bessemer.  The elementary and middle school grades were relocated to the old McAdory Elementary School in McCalla, which was more than twenty miles away.  When the school was rebuilt, the County School Board made the decision to construct a separate campus for the elementary school grades. Oak Grove Elementary School is located across the road from the new high school on Tiger Cub Trail.

Notable alumni 
 Euil "Snitz" Snider, U.S. Olympic Sprinter (1928 Games in Amsterdam), Alabama Sports Hall of Fame, Class of 1975 and Head Football Coach at Bessemer High School from 1933-1963 compiling record of 157-69-12
 John R. Vines, Lieutenant General, U.S. Army (Retired) was Commander, U.S. Army XVIII Airborne Corps & Multi-National Corps-Iraq

References

External links
Oak Grove school website
Oak Grove school profile on SchoolDigger
Oak Grove school profile on Niche
Oak Grove High School Marching Band
Oak Grove athletics website
Oak Grove football history

Public high schools in Alabama
Schools in Jefferson County, Alabama
Educational institutions established in 2000
Public middle schools in Alabama
2000 establishments in Alabama